R.E.D is the second studio album by Nigerian singer Tiwa Savage. It was released on December 19, 2015, by Mavin Records and 323 Entertainment. The album features guest appearances from Don Jazzy, Olamide, Dr SID, Iceberg Slim, 2face Idibia, D'Prince, Busy Signal and Reekado Banks. It was primarily produced by Don Jazzy, with additional production from Baby Fresh, Altims, Spellz and P2J. The album was supported by the singles "My Darlin" and "Standing Ovation". Its deluxe edition was released in February 2016 and features collaborations with Wizkid and P-Square. R.E.D was nominated for Best Album at the 2016 Nigeria Entertainment Awards.

Background and promotion
R.E.D is an acronym for Romance, Expression and Dance. It revolves around themes of sex, love and religious tropes. Savage recorded the album while pregnant with her son. The album was made available for free digital streaming on MTN Music, and was reportedly intended for release on December 21, 2015. Within 24 hours of its release, it became the most-streamed album of all time on the music platform. Mavin Records promoted the album by launching a meme generator through the website i-am-red.com. The website's interface allowed users to create a meme by uploading their pictures and entering values for the R.E.D acronym. Users had the option to enter text in the fields or choose from pre-defined suggestions. Users were encouraged to share their images on social media sites with the #IamRED hashtag.

While promoting the album in London, Savage stopped by BBC Africa's London Studio and spoke to Bola Mosuro about the project. She held an album listening party at Industry Nite and performed all the songs on the album. She also unveiled the album's cover art and narrated stories about each song on it. Guest in attendance included Fade Ogunro, Don Jazzy, Dr SID, D'Prince, Di'Ja, Korede Bello, Waje, 9ice, Tomi Odunsi, MC Galaxy and Iceberg Slim.

Composition
In the fuji-inspired street anthem "Standing Ovation", Savage appears tough and plays up her credibility. In "Adura", Don Jazzy channels Ebenezer Obey and incorporates drums and bass-guitar melodies. The secular track "African Waist" contains elements of Afro-Caribbean music and dubstep; its production features full horns, muted-trumpet solos and saxophone riffs. Echezonachukwu Nduka of Praxis Magazine said the song is "experimental in both rhythmic and vocal delivery". "We Don't Give a Damn" is composed of martial-like band music and muted trumpet riffs. "Rewind" has elements of Middle Eastern music, while the Dr SID-assisted track "If I Start to Talk" is grounded in Afrobeat. "Make time" is reminiscent of reggae music from the 80s. The dancehall pop track "Key to the City" features vocals by Jamaican singer Busy Signal. The emotional track "Bang Bang" has been described as the classic romance template in microcosm. The Reekado Banks-assisted track "Go Down" is thematically about oral sex. In "Love Me Hard", 2Baba reworked a line from his Grass 2 Grace album. In the D'Prince-assisted track "Before Nko", Savage brags about her sexual drive. Nduka criticized the song for appropriating Faze's "Need Somebody".

Singles and other releases
"My Darlin" was released as the album's lead single on October 8, 2014. It was jointly produced by Don Jazzy and Baby Fresh. The accompanying music video for "My Darlin" was directed by Kemi Adetiba.<ref name ="Okay Africa 1">{{cite web |author1=Z Weg |title=Tiwa Savage Shares Bittersweet Video For 'My Darlin |url=https://www.okayafrica.com/tiwa-savage-my-darlin-music-video/ |publisher=Okay Africa |accessdate=23 April 2019 |date=December 9, 2014 |archive-url=https://web.archive.org/web/20190423015425/https://www.okayafrica.com/tiwa-savage-my-darlin-music-video/ |archive-date=23 April 2019 |url-status=live }}</ref> In the video's opening scene, Savage plays the role of an older woman who jokes about a wedding party in a room full of bridesmaids. The video also depicts images of Savage's wedding gown and a non-linear portrait of a loving yet tragic relationship. The Olamide-assisted track "Standing Ovation" was released as the album's second single on January 14, 2016. The accompanying music video for "Standing Ovation" was shot and directed by Clarence Peters.

A carnival-themed music video for "African Waist" was shot in South Africa and released in December 2015. In the video, Don Jazzy plays the role of a fitness instructor. Princess Abumere of Pulse Nigeria described the song as a "cheerful fusion of soul calypso and afrobeat". The Clarence Peters-directed music video for "If I Start to Talk" was released In April 2016. A teaser clip of the video was released the previous day. Tope Delano of TooXclusive said the song is a "deeply personal and raw account of Tiwa's life story". The music video for the Wizkid-assisted track "Bad" was released in July 2016, a day after the confirmation of Savage's Roc Nation deal. It was directed by Sesan Ogunro and features cameo appearances from Banky W, Funke Akindele and Denrele Edun. In the video, Wizkid and Savage are seen putting up graffiti on the wall. The Clarence Peters-directed visuals for "Rewind" was released in October 2016; Nigerian actor Emmanuel Ikubuese plays Savage's love interest in the video.

Critical receptionR.E.D received mixed reviews from music critics. In a review for 360nobs, Wilfred Okiche characterized the album as "a basic Nigerian pop record" despite it boasting "an interesting concept driven title". Okiche also opined that Savage is more grounded on the album and knows who her target audiences are. A writer for Pulse Nigeria described the album as a "singer-songwriter’s album through and through" and said it is "personal and organic, fresh and contemporary without being beholden to conformist radio sounds".

Reviewing for Music in Africa, music journalist Oris Aigbokhaevbolo praised Savage for "producing an album deserving of the attention she craves", but cited the unevenness of the songwriting as its weakness. Ade Tayo of Simply African Music said R.E.D is quite inferior to Once Upon a Time from a direction and cohesive standpoint. Echezonachukwu Nduka of Praxis Magazine'' praised the album for staying true to its themes, but ended the review saying the "high presence of featured artistes robs her of full credits".

Accolades

Track listing

Personnel

Tiwatope Savage – primary artist, writer
Michael Collins Ajereh – executive producer, featured artist, writer, production 
Tunji "Tee Billz" Balogun – executive producer
Olamide Adedeji – featured artist, writer
Olusegun Olowokere – featured artist, writer
Innocent Idibia – featured artist, writer
Charles Enebeli – featured artist, writer
Sidney Onoriode Esiri – featured artist, writer
Glendale Goshia Gordon – featured artist, writer
Ayoleyi Hanniel Solomon – featured artist, writer
Ayodeji Balogun – featured artist, writer
Paul and Peter Okoye – featured artist, writer
Sunday "Baby Fresh" Enejere – production 
Aluko "Altims" Timothy – production 
Ben'Jamin "Spellz" Obadje – production 
Peter Jay – production

Release history

References

External links

2015 albums
Albums produced by Don Jazzy
Albums produced by Spellz
Tiwa Savage albums
Yoruba-language albums